Madhukarrao "Nana" Sadolikar was a Hindustani classical vocalist of the Jaipur-Atrauli Gharana. He was a disciple of Bhurji Khan and his elder brother, Wamanrao Sadolikar. A prominent figure in Kolhapur's classical music and natyageet scene, he is also known for being Manik Bhide's first guru and a prominent composer.

References

Hindustani singers
People from Kolhapur
20th-century Indian singers
Singers from Maharashtra